Pechstein is a German surname that may refer to

 Claudia Pechstein (born 1972), German speed skater
Heidi Pechstein (born 1944), German swimmer
 Max Pechstein (1881–1955), German painter
 43724 Pechstein, main belt asteroid named after Max Pechstein

German-language surnames